Blaze Media is an American conservative media company. It was founded in 2018 as a result of a merger between TheBlaze and CRTV LLC. The company's leadership consists of CEO Tyler Cardon and president Gaston Mooney. It is based in Irving, Texas, where it has studios and offices, as well as in Washington, D.C.

TheBlaze was a pay television network founded by Glenn Beck. Originally, it was called Glenn Beck TV, created after Beck's departure from Fox in 2011. In 2012, the network took the name of Beck's popular website, TheBlaze. From 2014 to 2017, the company had four different CEOs, followed by Beck himself. Months after Beck took the position, the company laid off over a fourth of its staff. CRTV LLC, which operated the Conservative Review and CRTV (Conservative Review Television), was an online subscription network.

History 
On August 31, 2010, three days after his Restoring Honor rally at the Lincoln Memorial in Washington, D.C., conservative political commentator Glenn Beck launched the TheBlaze website, describing it as an alternative to "mainstream media outlets". TheBlaze headquarters are located in Irving, Texas, at the Mercury Studios (formerly the Studios at Las Colinas).

Beck announced the creation of an online-only network replacing Insider Extreme as a result of his Fox News departure on June 7, 2011. On September 12, 2011, Beck launched GBTV (Glenn Beck TV) as an exclusive internet streaming network, produced and operated by Mercury Radio Arts. GBTV would air a television adaptation of his radio show, his television show, and other original programming, including Real News from TheBlaze, a nightly news program hosted by former CNN personality Amy Holmes. On June 18, 2012, Mercury Radio Arts announced the consolidation of all of its outlets under the "TheBlaze" brand, thus renaming the internet television station from GBTV to TheBlaze.

In 2012, Dish Network placed TheBlaze on its channel lineup. As a result of the "Get TheBlaze" campaign (a movement led by supporters to have other supporters call their cable or satellite television provider and ask them to carry the channel), several smaller, regional cable operators also have recently picked up TheBlaze—including Cablevision (also known as Optimum TV – Channel 828), a major cable provider in the New York metropolitan area.

Betsy Morgan was named CEO of TheBlaze on December 9, 2014, replacing Chris Balfe, who had been CEO since the beginning. Morgan left the company in June 2015. Chief Revenue Officer Kraig Kitchin replaced Morgan until he resigned in January 2016, taking the position of Interim Head of Sales and being replaced by Stewart Padveen, a digital startup entrepreneur, who resigned in February 2017. Beck took over as CEO of the company in May 2017.

In November 2015, Beck sent an open letter to the Republican National Committee, requesting permission for TheBlaze to host a Republican presidential debate; this offer was not accepted.

On August 31, 2017, TheBlaze laid off nearly 60 employees, which cut its personnel by almost 30%.

On December 28, 2018, Verizon Fios removed TheBlaze from its lineup.  TheBlaze is available as Blaze Live on ad-supported streaming service Pluto TV with 24 hours a day programming.

Merger with CRTV 

On December 3, 2018, TheBlaze Inc. television arm merged with CRTV LLC, combining resources, personalities, personnel, subscribers, and programming. The merged entity, named Blaze Media, retained TheBlaze's channel slot and incorporated two of CRTV's programs into the channel's schedule (Steve Deace Show and Wilkow!).

Gavin McInnes, the co-founder of Vice Media and Vice magazine, founder of the Proud Boys, was expected to host his programs Get Off My Lawn and CRTV Tonight for the new company, whose co-president, Gaston Mooney, called McInnes "a comedian and provocateur, one of the many varied voices and viewpoints on Blaze Media platforms." Less than a week after the merger, however, it was announced that McInnes was no longer associated with Blaze Media, with no details given as to why. Former contributor Michelle Malkin likewise followed McInnes out the door after CRTV merger with TheBlaze in December 2018.

Notable program hosts for television, and radio and podcasts 

 Glenn Beck – host of Glenn TV and The Glenn Beck Radio Program
 Stu Burguiere – The Glenn Beck Radio Program (co-host/executive producer), Stu Does America (host)
 Steve Deace – host of the Steve Deace Show
 Kevin Freeman – host of Economic War Room
 Pat Gray – Pat Gray Unleashed (host), The Glenn Radio Program (recurring regular and frequent fill-in host)
 Mark Levin – host of LevinTV
 Chad Prather – host of The Chad Prather Show
 Dave Rubin – host of The Rubin Report
 Allie Beth Stuckey – host of Relatable with Allie Beth Stuckey
 Matt Kibbe – host of Kibbe on Liberty
 Phil Robertson – host of In the Woods with Phil and Unashamed with Phil Robertson
 Jason Whitlock – host of Fearless with Jason Whitlock

Frequent guests 
 Ben Shapiro – editor emeritus of The Daily Wire and host of the syndicated radio show The Ben Shapiro Show
 Daniel Lapin – Jewish Rabbi
 David Barton – Christian Zionist, evangelical political activist and author
 Ted Cruz – United States senator from Texas
 Jeremy Boreing – COO and co-founder of The Daily Wire
 Mike Lee – United States senator from Utah
 Bill O'Reilly – Former television host of The O'Reilly Factor on Fox News, and host of No Spin News
 Dennis Prager – founder of PragerU and political commentator
 Ben Sasse – United States senator from Nebraska
 John W. Whitehead – founder of the Rutherford Institute
 Howard Kohr – CEO of AIPAC
 John Hagee – televangelist and founder of Christians United for Israel
 Kirk Cameron – evangelical actor
 Alex Stein – Comedian

Former hosts and contributors 
 Steven Crowder – Louder with Crowder (departed 2022)
 S. E. Cupp – Real News
 Laurie Dhue – Blaze news anchor
 Tomi Lahren – Tomi (2015–2017)
 Dana Loesch – Dana (2013–2017)
 Michelle Malkin – host of Michelle Malkin Investigates (departed 2018, show moved to Newsmax TV)
 Gavin McInnes – host of Get Off My Lawn (departed 2018)
 Jay Severin – The Jay Severin Show (2012–2016)
 Andrew Heaton  – Something’s Off with Andrew Heaton (2018–2019)
 Andrew W.K. – America W.K.
 Andrew Wilkow – Wilkow! (departed 2021, show moved to Salem News Channel)

Controversies

Alexandria Ocasio-Cortez video 
In July 2018, CRTV published a satirical video that featured footage of then-Democratic candidate in New York's 14th congressional district midterm election, Alexandria Ocasio-Cortez, from a previous interview with PBS. The previous interview was edited to appear as if Ocasio-Cortez was giving nonsensical answers to questions read by CRTV commentator Allie Stuckey, a comedy routine more famously done by "Weird Al" Yankovic on his Al TV series. The video was accompanied by a caption reading "Allie *grills* congressional hopeful and progressive it girl 'Alexandria Ocasio-Cortez' on her socialist agenda and knowledge of government... or lack thereof." Following outcry from various media outlets, the outlet updated the caption to indicate that the video was satirical and included a link to the original PBS interview.

Jon Miller's Bong Joon-ho Oscars tweet 
On February 9, 2020, White House Brief host Jon Miller posted a tweet in response to South Korean filmmaker Bong Joon-ho, director of Parasite, and his acceptance speech at the 92nd Academy Awards for Best Original Screenplay. Miller wrote: "A man named Bong Joon Ho wins #Oscar for best original screenplay over Once Upon a Time in Hollywood and 1917. Acceptance speech was: 'GREAT HONOR. THANK YOU.' Then he proceeds to give the rest of his speech in Korean. These people are the destruction of America."
The tweet immediately caused controversy, with numerous Twitter users and celebrities accusing Miller of racism and xenophobia. Miller clarified on his show that his tweet was not directed at Koreans, but rather those "woke" people in Hollywood who ignored social conventions.

Additional outlets

Radio 

TheBlaze Radio Network was launched on September 5, 2012 and is available for free online via the company's website, iOS and Android apps, and the iHeartRadio app. TheBlaze Radio Network is the only host airing conservative talk-show host Pat Gray.

Website 

TheBlaze website launched on August 26, 2010. According to Beck, the site took two months to design. At launch, the site's chief editor was Scott Baker, with its associate editor-video producer Pam Key and with Jon Seidl and Meredith Jessup as reporters. Key is known for her blog, Naked Emperor News: Smoking Gun Video and Images. Baker is a former Pittsburgh, Pennsylvania, broadcast journalist who previously worked at The Huffington Post and Breitbart TV. Seidl, of the Manhattan Institute, previously worked at The American Spectator. Jessup previously worked at Townhall. Journalists joining TheBlaze later included S. E. Cupp and David Harsanyi.

In January 2011, Betsy Morgan became president and Kraig Kitchin director of sales. Morgan had helmed The Huffington Post until 2009. Kitchin had formerly been the president of Premier Radio.

In March 2011, the site was noted for its critique of James O'Keefe's NPR sting video.

Magazine 
TheBlaze (entitled Fusion prior to September 2012) was a monthly news magazine published by Mercury Radio Arts and TheBlaze in New York City and circulated throughout the United States. Its former title, Fusion, was taken from Beck's talk radio program's slogan, "The Fusion of Entertainment and Enlightenment." The editor-in-chief was Scott Baker. The magazine was sixteen pages and was published monthly except for February and August. It was available digitally and in print. The last edition of TheBlaze magazine was published in April 2015.

References

External links 
 
 TV
 Radio
 Mercury Radio Arts

 
2011 establishments in Texas
24-hour television news channels in the United States
Companies based in Irving, Texas
Conservative media in the United States
Defunct television networks in the United States
Internet properties established in 2010
Mass media companies based in New York City
Tea Party movement
Television channels and stations established in 2011
Television channels and stations disestablished in 2019
Television news in the United States
YouTube channels